Anastasiya Alexandrovna Kapachinskaya (born November 20, 1979) is a Russian former sprint athlete. She was the 2003 World champion in the 200 m. She was disqualified from competitions in 2004 and 2008 due to doping offences. As a result, the bulk of her athletics performances after 2004 have been annulled.

Career 
Kapachinskaya won the women's 200 m at the 2003 World Championships in Athletics in Paris. The following year, she was initially awarded gold in the 200 m event at the 2004 IAAF World Indoor Championships in Budapest but was stripped of the title after testing positive for the banned anabolic steroid stanozolol. She denied all knowledge of how it had happened, and during her two-year ban she vowed to work with the World Anti-Doping Agency to promote sports without drugs.

At the 2008 Summer Olympics, Kapachinskaya reached the 400 m final, where she placed fifth. She initially won silver in the 4 × 400 m relay. In 2009, she advanced to the 400 m final at the world championships and finished 6th. The Russian team which included Kapachinskaya initially achieved a bronze in the relay.

In May 2016, it was reported that Kapachinskaya was one of 14 Russian athletes, and nine medalists, implicated in doping following the retesting of urine from the 2008 Olympics. Kapachinskaya was named by Russian press agency TASS as having failed the retest, which was undertaken following the Russian doping scandal of 2015 and 2016. If confirmed, under IOC and IAAF rules, Kapachinskaya stood to lose all results, medals and records from the date of the original test to May 2016. As this would be a second doping offence, she would also face a lifetime ban from the sport. In August 2016, Kapachinskaya and her relay teammates were officially stripped of their 2008 silver medal. Kapachinskaya had tested positive for the steroids stanozol and turinabol. On 21 June 2017 it was reported that Kapachinskaya had forfeited all results and medals from 17 August 2008 onwards.

See also
List of doping cases in athletics

References

1979 births
Living people
Athletes from Moscow
Russian female sprinters
Olympic female sprinters
Olympic athletes of Russia
Athletes (track and field) at the 2008 Summer Olympics
Athletes (track and field) at the 2012 Summer Olympics
Competitors stripped of Summer Olympics medals
World Athletics Championships athletes for Russia
World Athletics Championships winners
Athletes stripped of World Athletics Championships medals
Russian Athletics Championships winners
Russian sportspeople in doping cases
Doping cases in athletics